Robert Abraham may refer to:

Robert Abraham (American football) (born 1960), American football player
Robert Abraham (architect) (1773–1850), English surveyor and architect
Robert Abraham (MP) (1410–1470), English Member of Parliament for Portsmouth

See also
Robert Abrams (born 1938), American lawyer and politician
Robert B. Abrams (born 1960), US Army General